The Greece men's national tennis team represents Greece in Davis Cup tennis competition and are governed by the Hellenic Tennis Federation.

Greece currently compete in Europe Zone Group III.  They have never competed in the World Group, but reached the European Zone quarterfinals three times.

Current team (2022) 

 Stefanos Tsitsipas
 Michail Pervolarakis
 Petros Tsitsipas
 Aristotelis Thanos
 Alexandros Skorilas

History
Greece competed in its first Davis Cup in 1927.  Some of their present and past players include Solon Peppas, Konstantinos Economidis, Alex Jakupovic, Anastasios Bavelas, Vasilis Mazarakis, George Kalovelonis, and Paris Gemouchidis.

See also
Davis Cup
Greece Fed Cup team

External links

Davis Cup teams
Davis Cup
Davis Cup